Josko Farac (born 13 August 1969 in Split) is a Croatian former football defender. He formerly played with HNK Hajduk Split, NK Primorac, NK Zadar, NK Mladost 127, HŠK Zrinjski Mostar, Perak FA in Malaysia.

External sources
 Interview from 2003 at Slobodna Dalmacija.

1969 births
Living people
Footballers from Split, Croatia
Association football defenders
Croatian footballers
HNK Hajduk Split players
NK Primorac 1929 players
NK Zadar players
HNK Suhopolje players
HŠK Zrinjski Mostar players
Perak F.C. players
Croatian Football League players
Croatian expatriate footballers
Expatriate footballers in Bosnia and Herzegovina
Croatian expatriate sportspeople in Bosnia and Herzegovina
Expatriate footballers in Malaysia
Croatian expatriate sportspeople in Malaysia